Brian Nicholas Wayne Marchinko (August 2, 1948 – May 12, 2014) was a Canadian professional ice hockey player who played 47 games in the National Hockey League (NHL) with the New York Islanders and Toronto Maple Leafs between 1970 and 1974. The rest of his career, which lasted from 1969 to 1977, was spent in the minor leagues. He was born in Weyburn, Saskatchewan and died in Chilliwack, British Columbia.

Career statistics

Regular season and playoffs

References

External links
 

1948 births
2014 deaths
Canadian ice hockey centres
Erie Blades players
Flin Flon Bombers players
Fort Worth Wings players
Fort Worth Texans players
Ice hockey people from Saskatchewan
Johnstown Jets (NAHL) players
New Haven Nighthawks players
New York Islanders players
Providence Reds players
Sportspeople from Weyburn
Toronto Maple Leafs players
Tulsa Oilers (1964–1984) players
Undrafted National Hockey League players